Carpaccio is a dish of meat or fish (such as beef, veal, venison, salmon or tuna), thinly sliced or pounded thin, and served raw, typically as an appetizer. It was invented in 1963 by Giuseppe Cipriani from Harry's Bar in Venice, Italy and popularised during the second half of the twentieth century. The beef was served with lemon, olive oil, and white truffle or Parmesan cheese. Later, the term was extended to dishes containing other raw meats or fish, thinly sliced and served with lemon or vinegar, olive oil, salt and ground pepper, and fruits such as mango or pineapple.

History
The dish, based on the Piedmont speciality carne cruda all'albese, was invented in 1963 by Giuseppe Cipriani, founder of Harry's Bar in Venice. He originally prepared the dish for countess Amalia Nani Mocenigo when he learned that her doctors had recommended that she eat raw meat. The dish was named carpaccio after Vittore Carpaccio, the Venetian painter known for the characteristic red and white tones of his work.

See also

 Bresaola
 Ceviche
 Chee kufta
 Crudo
 Gored gored
 Kibbeh nayyeh
 Kitfo
 Kuai
 Mett
 Neobiani
 Poke
 Sashimi
 Steak tartare
 Stroganina
 Yukhoe

References

Further reading
 
 
 
 

Italian meat dishes
Appetizers
Veal dishes
Uncooked meat dishes
Seafood
Raw beef dishes
Uncooked fish dishes